Atemnidae is a family of pseudoscorpions.

Subfamilies and genera
The family contains the following genera, divided into two subfamilies:

 Subfamily Atemninae
 Anatemnus Beier, 1932
 Atemnus Canestrini, 1884
 Athleticatemnus Beier, 1979
 Catatemnus Beier, 1932
 Cyclatemnus Beier, 1932
 Mesatemnus Beier and Turk, 1952
 Metatemnus Beier, 1932
 Micratemnus Beier, 1932
 Oratemnus Beier, 1932
 Paratemnoides Harvey, 1991
 †Progonatemnus Beier, 1955
 Stenatemnus Beier, 1932
 Synatemnus Beier, 1944
 Tamenus Beier, 1932
 Titanatemnus Beier, 1932
 Trinidadatemnus Tooren, 2008
 Subfamily Miratemninae Beier, 1932 (sometimes considered a separate family, Miratemnidae)
 Brazilatemnus Muchmore, 1975
 Caecatemnus Mahnert, 1985
 Diplotemnus J. C. Chamberlin, 1933
 Miratemnus Beier, 1932
 Nilotemnus Klausen, 2009
 Tullgrenius J. C. Chamberlin, 1933

References

 
Pseudoscorpion families